The election of all 99 seats in the Tennessee House of Representatives occurred on November 8, 2022, concurrent with the Governor, U.S. House, and State Senate elections. 

Republicans gained two seats, expanding their supermajority in the state house even more. John Windle lost his re-election bid after registering as an Independent.

Retirements

Republicans
District 18: Eddie Mannis retired. 
District 24: Mark Hall retired to run unsuccessfully for State Senate
District 32: Kent Calfee retired.
District 35: Jerry Sexton retired.
District 61: Brandon Ogles retired.
District 63: Glen Casada retired to unsuccessfully run for Williamson County Clerk
District 69: Michael Curcio retired.
District 71: David Byrd retired.
District 75: Bruce Griffey retired.
District 79: Curtis Halford retired.

Democrats
District 52: Mike Stewart retired.
District 59: Jason Potts retired
District 67: Jason Hodges retired

Incumbents defeated

In the primary election

Republicans
District 20: Bob Ramsey lost to Bryan Richey
District 40: Terri Lynn Weaver lost to Michael Hale

In the general election

Independents
District 41: John Windle lost re-election to Ed Butler.

Predictions

Results summary

Close races
Four races were decided by a margin of 10% or less:

Overview

Results

District 1

District 2

District 3

District 4

District 5

District 6

District 7

District 8

District 9

District 10

District 11

District 12

District 13

District 14

District 15

District 16

District 17

District 18

District 19

District 20

District 21

District 22

District 23

District 24

See also
 2022 Tennessee elections
 2022 Tennessee Senate election

References

House of Representatives
Tennessee House
Tennessee House of Representatives election elections